Maria Lvovna "Masha" Katz (born 23 January 1973), also known by her stage name Youddiph, is a Russian singer. She is best known for representing Russia in the Eurovision Song Contest 1994 held in Dublin, the first time Russia has competed in the competition.

Biography
Masha was born on 23 January 1973 in Moscow. At the age of 13 she formed her first group performing heavy metal songs. In 1989 she met with the famous poet Karen Kavaleryan who helped her to launch a professional career. For the next 5 years Masha worked as a backing vocalist for numerous Russian artists and groups.

In 1994 she represented Russia in the Eurovision Song Contest 1994 with the song "Vyechniy stranik" (Вечный странник). Maria performed 23rd at the final night and ranked 9th with 70 points. Later that year she released her first album entitled "Magic Word".

Masha continued to work with various musicians and formed a duo with a Russian drummer under the name "Beauty and the Beast". In 1997 she created a new group, called "Maryland". The group made an album in 1998 entitled Ryzhiy blues ( - Ginger Blues). In 2000 she was presented with two important music awards while creating her own music company.

Masha also dubbed musicals and films for the Russian television and cinema, including Anastasia, for which she was presented with a special prize of 20th Century Fox for the best native language performance.
Nowadays Maria continues to sing in clubs, doing backing vocals for famous singers and works as a vocal coach.

She has a daughter Seraphima Katz, born in 2001. She currently lives with artist Andrey Makarevich.

The Voice Blind Audition 
In 2015, Masha Katz auditioned for the Russian edition of Dutch TV series The Voice. Two judges turned their chairs, and eventually she chose to join the team of Grigory Leps.

References

External links
 Official website
 Вечный странник
 www.esckaz.com/russia/1994e.htm
 www.eurovision.tv
 

1973 births
Living people
Singers from Moscow
Russian Jews
Eurovision Song Contest entrants for Russia
Eurovision Song Contest entrants of 1994
Jewish women singers
21st-century Russian singers
21st-century Russian women singers
Russian activists against the 2022 Russian invasion of Ukraine